Mount Hubley may refer to:

Mount Hubley (Alaska), the second highest peak in the Brooks Range, Alaska, USA
Mount Hubley (Antarctica)